The Mislinja is a river in the northern part of Slovenia. It flows through Mislinja and Slovenj Gradec and empties from the right into the Meža River north of the village of Otiški Vrh near Dravograd, only a couple hundred meters before the Meža joins the Drava River.

Name
The name Mislinja is derived from the phrase *Myslin'a (voda) (literally, 'Myslinъ's creek'), thus referring to a person or people living along the watercourse. The hypocorism *Myslinъ is derived from the personal name *Myslь. The town of Mislinja is named after the river.

References

External links

Confluence of the Meža, Mislinja, and Drava rivers, interactive map at Najdi.si

Rivers of Carinthia (Slovenia)